Christ Church, more commonly known as the Unitarian Universalist Fellowship or First Universalist Church of Middletown is a historic Universalist church located at Middletown in Orange County, New York. It was built in 1901. It features an offset bell tower and Tiffany glass memorial window. Also located on the property is an earlier frame parish house.

It was listed on the National Register of Historic Places in 2008.

References

External links
UU Middletown

Churches on the National Register of Historic Places in New York (state)
Gothic Revival church buildings in New York (state)
Unitarian Universalist churches in New York (state)
Churches completed in 1901
20th-century Unitarian Universalist church buildings
Churches in Orange County, New York
National Register of Historic Places in Orange County, New York